The University of Hawaiʻi – West Oʻahu (UHWO) is a public college in Kapolei, Hawaii. It is part of the University of Hawaiʻi system. It offers baccalaureate degrees in liberal arts and professional studies. UHWO opened in January 1976 and since 1981 has been accredited by the WASC Senior College and University Commission or its predecessor. In 2007, the school added first- and second-year subjects, becoming a four-year college.

UHWO is the US' fastest-growing public baccalaureate college. It has one of the most diverse student populations among four-year public institutions, according to the Chronicle of Higher Education. It is the newest campus in the University of Hawaiʻi, It was established in part to provide access to higher education in Leeward Oʻahu.

The college offers undergraduate education. It enrolled 3,182 students in fall 2018, many from Leeward Oahu. UHWO also reaches students around the state with its Distance Learning program. About 10 percent of University of Hawaiʻi – West Oʻahu’s enrollment list another island as their permanent address.

University of Hawaiʻi – West Oʻahu has the highest percentage of distance and online courses and programs and the highest percentage of part-time students in University of Hawaiʻi. University of Hawaiʻi – West Oʻahu supports the study of Hawaiian language, history and culture. The student:faculty ratio is 24:1. Tuition is among the lowest in the nation.

History
The idea for opening a second UH campus on Oahu formed in the mid-1960s over concern that the University of Hawaiʻi at Mānoa could not accommodate everyone.

In 1966 the University of Hawaiʻi Board of Regents approved a plan calling for the opening of such a campus. In 1970, UH executive Richard Kosaki was appointed chancellor for the proposed school known as West Oahu College. Kosaki proposed a new campus to serve the growing population in Leeward Oahu, where college attendance lagged other areas on the island.

Opponents held that another campus was not needed and would take resources from other campuses.

The college was approved by the Board of Regents as an upper division school in 1975. It opened in January 1976 with 75 students attending classes held at Mililani, Campbell and Pearl City high schools. It moved later that year to a Newtown Square office building in ʻAiea, Hawaiʻi, offering day and evening classes. The institution gained WASC accreditation in February 1981 and moved adjacent to Leeward Community College in Pearl City. It began outreach programs in 1981 and 1983 sending faculty to Kauaʻi and Maui to teach classes on weekends.

In 1989 the school’s name changed to the University of Hawaiʻi – West Oʻahu to better identify it as part of the University of Hawaiʻi System. It began planning to become a four-year institution. University of Hawaiʻi – West Oʻahu added lower-division curricula in 2007, and in 2012 moved to a newly built campus in Kapolei.

An Administration and Health Science building was added in 2018, and construction on a building for the Academy for Creative Media began in January 2019.

Academics
University of Hawaiʻi – West Oʻahu has degree programs and concentrations that emphasize liberal arts and practical applications, including creative media, cybersecurity, facilities management, and sustainable community food systems. Students choose among eight degree offerings with more than 40 concentrations. The average class size in Fall 2018 was 20 students. University of Hawaiʻi – West Oʻahu also offers the following eight certificates: Applied Forensic Anthropology, Asian Studies, Disaster Preparedness & Emergency Management, Gender Studies, Health Care Administration, Music, Risk Management & Insurance, and Substance Abuse & Addictions Studies.

Distance learning
University of Hawaiʻi – West Oʻahu offers in-person and online classes. Twenty-nine percent of students were enrolled exclusively in distance education courses in Fall 2017; 38 percent took at least one such course.

University of Hawaiʻi System Community College students on Neighbor Islands can pursue online four-year degrees and certificates at University of Hawaiʻi – West Oʻahu. Classes may also be delivered through interactive television and in person. Three degrees and 12 concentrations are available.

Campus
The campus is located on 500 acres of former sugarcane land. The campus’ property includes a separate 991-acre parcel located above the H-1 Freeway.

Clubs and organizations

Accounting Club
University of Hawaiʻi – West Oʻahu offers an accounting club. The club was created in 2000 to network students with professionals and prepare their skills for the accounting industry.

Student National Education Association
The Student National Education Association (SNEA), also known as Education Club, helps students to improve and expand their knowledge of the teaching profession. SNEA provides an opportunity for future teachers to connect with local teachers and participate in the national student leadership conference.

Associated Students of University of Hawaiʻi – West Oʻahu
The Associated Students of University of Hawaiʻi – West Oʻahu (ASUHWO) is an organization of the student body government committee that helps support student groups and organizes school functions and funding. ASUHWO has committee officers such as President, Vice President, Secretary, Treasurer and other Senators from each class division.

Athletics
University of Hawaiʻi – West Oʻahu features an intramural sports program. The program is available to all enrolled students. The program includes of five sports including: flag football, volleyball, basketball, soccer and softball. The school’s mascot is the pueo, an owl native to Hawaii.

Chancellors
Maenette K.P. Benham 2017–present
Rockne C. Freitas 2013-2016

References

External links

1976 establishments in Hawaii
University of Hawaiʻi
Education in Honolulu County, Hawaii
Educational institutions established in 1976